In geology, lode refers to an economic mineral deposit.

Lode may also refer to:

Distinction
 Lode, similar to mother lode, an old English word meaning rich source of supply
 In Italy, lode is also a distinction awarded to exceptional students completing a bachelor's degree

Places
 Lode, Cambridgeshire, a village in England
 Lode Parish, an administrative unit of the Rūjiena Municipality, Latvia

Other uses
 Cambridgeshire Lodes, a network of artificial drainage channels in England
 Lode Runner,  a 1983 platform game
 Lodestone, a magnetized rock
 Lode coordinates, a coordinate system
 Lode (name), a given name and surname
 Live OWL Documentation Environment, to support computer-based ontologies

See also
 Lodes (disambiguation)
 Lodestar (disambiguation)